John Browne's Body was a British television comedy series aired in 1969 on ITV. Produced by Associated Television (ATV), it starred popular actress Peggy Mount.

All seven episodes are believed to have been destroyed.

References

External links
John Browne's Body on IMDb

1969 British television series debuts
1969 British television series endings
Lost television shows
English-language television shows
ITV sitcoms
1960s British comedy television series